Guymon is a city and county seat of Texas County, in the panhandle of Oklahoma, United States. As of the 2020 census, the city population was 12,965, an increase of 13.3% from 11,442 in 2010, and represents more than half of the population of the county. Cattle feedlots, corporate pork farms, and natural gas production dominate its economy, with wind energy production and transmission recently diversifying landowners' farms.  Guymon was the only town or city in Oklahoma in 2010 and 2020 in which the majority of the population was Hispanic.

History

In the 1890s, Edward T. "E.T." Guymon, president of the Inter-State Land and Town Company, purchased a section of land west of the Beaver River, also known as the North Canadian River. The site grew very rapidly after the Chicago, Rock Island and Pacific Railway (Rock Island) built a line from Liberal, Kansas, to Texhoma, Texas, in 1901. A community, first named Sanford by the U.S. Post Office Department, was situated along the line. It was renamed Guymon a month later by postal officials to avoid confusion with the town of Stratford, Texas, which was further down the line.  Guymon incorporated in 1901. The town plat was filed in Beaver County, Oklahoma Territory, in 1904.

Guymon's growth was helped when most of the businesses moved there from the nearby town of Hardesty. One of these was the newspaper, Hardesty Herald, which owner Richard B. Quinn quickly renamed as the Guymon Herald. When Oklahoma became a state in 1907, Guymon claimed 839 residents, and was named county seat of the newly created Texas County. By the 1910 U.S. census, the town had 1,342 residents. It also had three banks, three hotels, four doctors,  a flour mill, a grain company, and several retail establishments. A second newspaper, the Guymon Democrat, was in business. Agriculture became the basis of Guymon's economy. The 1920 census recorded 1,507 residents, which grew to 2,181 in 1930.  By 1932, the town had two cream stations and five grain elevators.

The Great Depression and the Dust Bowl of the 1930s had a negative effect on Guymon. Some old-time residents remember "Black Sunday", April 14, 1935, as the day of the worst dust storm in the area's history. However, discovery of the nearby Hugoton-Panhandle gas field created many new jobs, and brought Guymon's population to 2,290 in 1940.

The Guymon Pioneer Days Rodeo has offered tributes to the community's pioneer spirit every May since 1933.  In 2014, the rodeo was inducted into the ProRodeo Hall of Fame of the Professional Rodeo Cowboys Association.  In 2006, the rodeo had over 900 contestants with over $385,000 in prize money.

Geography

Climate

Demographics

As of the 2020 census, there were 12,965 people and 3,453 households residing in the city. The population density was 1,662 people per square mile (642/km). There were 3,941 housing units at an average density of 539.4 per square mile (208.2/km). The racial makeup of the city as of 2020 was 58.1% Hispanic, 29.3% non-Hispanic White, 3.6% Black, 5.6% Asian, 4.7% of two or more races, and 0.1% Native American.

There were 3,453 households; the average household size was 3.28 persons. As of 2010, 39.8% of households had children under the age of 18 living with them, 59.0% were married couples living together, 8.7% had a female householder with no husband present, and 27.9% were non-families. 21.5% of all households were made up of individuals, and 8.5% had someone living alone who was 65 years of age or older. 

In the city, the population was spread out, with 31.3% under the age of 18 and 7.6% who were 65 years of age or older. 45.2% of the city's 2020 population was female.

The median income for a household in the city was $53,164. The per capita income for the city was $19,455. About 24.6% of the population was below the poverty line, increasing from 14.3% in 2010.

In the 2010 census, Guymon had the fourth largest Hispanic population among cities in the state, trailing only Oklahoma City, Tulsa and Lawton. In terms of percentages, the Hispanic population of Guymon comprised 52 percent of the population, the highest percentage of Hispanic residents of any city or town in Oklahoma. In 2022 the Hispanic population was 57 percent of the total population of Guymon. Guymon has been cited as an example of how immigration can save rural communities, most of which in Oklahoma and many other states have been losing population for decades.

Economy

Guymon is a hub for the local economy, which includes wheat farming, livestock, hog and dairy farming, manufacturing, and oil and natural gas production. A United States soil conservation station is located nearby. Local manufacturers produce agricultural tillage tools, pressure tanks, and formula feeds.

Opening of the Hugoton-Panhandle Gas Field led to the establishment of two carbon black plants, the Dandee Manufacturing Company (makers of farming equipment), an ice plant, the OK Welding Manufacturing Company, a feed mill, the Phillips Petroleum cracking plant, and the Southwestern Public Service Company generating plant. The Guymon Municipal Hospital (later renamed Memorial Hospital of Texas County) opened in 1949.

The city's largest employer, Seaboard pork processing plant, operates at double shift capacity and processes about 18,000 hogs each day, and its 2,300 employees make up about 20% of the entire city's population.  Hitch Ranch, which began opening cattle feedlots during the 1960s, is the city's second-largest employer.  A Swift and Company packing plant is located near Hitch Ranch.  The City of Guymon, the Panhandle Telephone Cooperative, and the hospital round out the list of top employers. The employment opportunities created by these industries, especially of the Seaboard company, has led to an influx of Hispanics and recent immigrants to the U.S. which accounts for the population growth of Guymon and the surrounding area while most of Oklahoma's small cities and rural communities are losing population. 

A movement to harness wind power for electricity generation began a large-scale boom in the Guymon area in 2011. The DeWind Company had two 40-megawatt projects online (near Goodwell) in 2012, joined by a 200-megawatt project in 2015.

Government
Guymon has a council-manager form of government. Mitch Wagner was the city manager as of February 2018.

Education
Guymon residents are served by the Guymon School District. The school system was begun in 1902–3. The first high-school building was built in 1917. Guymon schools were closed for one year during the Great Depression because funds were insufficient  to keep them operating. The school district opened a new high school in 1954. This was replaced with a new facility in 1974.

The city has eight elementary schools, one junior high school, and one high school, whose team mascot is the Tiger.

High school
 Guymon High School
Middle school
 Guymon Junior High School
Elementary schools
 Academy
 Academy "C"
 Carrier
 Homer Long
 Northeast
 North Park
 Prairie

More than 80% of high school students qualify for a reduced-price school lunch, a common proxy for poverty.

About 30% of residents lack a high school diploma; the city has the lowest educational level in the state. Guymon High School lags behind the state average in several measures.

Media
Guymon has one newspaper and four radio stations, although one is a translator.
 Guymon Herald, printed since 1891, is the only daily newspaper for the entire Oklahoma Panhandle.
 KKBS 92.7 FM  - Rock
 KBIJ 99.5 FM  - Regional Mexican 
 KGYN 1210 AM  - News and Sports Talk
 K215CV 90.9 FM  - Christian Contemporary (Air1)

Recreation

 Golden Mesa Casino is 2 1/2 mi west on US Hwy 54.
Sunset Hills golf course – an 18-hole par-71 municipal course - is open to members and guests in Guymon.
 Sunset Lake and Thompson Park – a 32-acre stocked municipal lake - is open to fishing year-round, with paddle boats, an operating miniature train, ducks to be fed, playground equipment for children, picnic tables, and covered pavilions.
 No Mans Land Rifle and Pistol Club – a 50-station handgun and rimfire rifle range - is open to members of the club, located near Sunset Lake and Thompson Park, and open for use during daylight hours.
Nearby Optima National Wildlife Refuge offers bird and wildlife viewing opportunities, and the Optima Wildlife Management Area, run by the Oklahoma Department of Wildlife Conservation, offers hunting opportunities.

Infrastructure

Transportation

Guymon is served by US-54, US-64, US-412, SH-3, and SH-136, some of said roads being partially concurrent or completely concurrent with others through Guymon.

Guymon Municipal Airport is a city-owned, public-use airport located two nautical miles (3.7 km) west of the central business district of Guymon.

Commercial air transport is available out of Liberal Mid-America Regional Airport in Kansas, about 41 miles northeast of town.

Notable people
 Jeremy Sochan - Basketball player for the San Antonio Spurs, was born in Guymon but relocated to Southampton as an infant.
 Michael D. Brown – former FEMA director was born in Guymon in 1955.
 Claudia Bryar (1918-2011) - film and television actress, was born in Guymon.
 F. Hiner Dale (1881–1968) – Judge and founder of Guymon law firm of Wright, Dale, and Jett
 Gordon Grice (b. 1965) – award-winning nature writer, was born in Guymon.
 Ross Rizley (1892-1969) - former U.S. Representative, is buried in Guymon.
 Sammi Smith (1943-2005) - country music star - born Jewel Faye Smith

See also

 National Register of Historic Places listings in Texas County, Oklahoma

References

External links

 City of Guymon
 Guymon Daily Herald
 Guymon Pioneer Days Rodeo
 Main Street Guymon
 Encyclopedia of Oklahoma History and Culture – Guymon

Cities in Oklahoma
County seats in Oklahoma
Cities in Texas County, Oklahoma
Micropolitan areas of Oklahoma
Populated places established in 1901
Oklahoma Panhandle
1901 establishments in Oklahoma Territory